Princess Python is a supervillain appearing in American comic books published by Marvel Comics.

Publication history
Princess Python, Zelda DuBois, is a snake charmer who controls a gigantic snake to help with her crimes. She first appeared in The Amazing Spider-Man #22 (Mar 1965), created by writer Stan Lee and artist Steve Ditko.

Zelda DuBois started out as a snake charmer, using a 25-foot python in her act. She later became a criminal, using a gigantic snake under her mental control to commit crimes as Princess Python, part of the Circus of Crime. DuBois and the Circus are part of a group of villains that interrupt the wedding of Avengers Yellowjacket and the Wasp. She later becomes a member of the Serpent Squad as well as its successor the Serpent Society, but left the group as she is not a killer. She later rejoins the Circus, but later ends up in a romantic relationship with Johnny Blaze, former Ghost Rider, until they are attacked by Arcade. DuBois has been married to both Stilt-Man and Gibbon and was later revealed to be the mother of Executioner from the Young Masters, although her son is not aware of his mother's alter ego. In 2015, Princess Python became a member of Serpent Solutions as part of the All-New, All-Different Marvel.

Fictional character biography
Zelda DuBois, born in Darlington, South Carolina, developed an act as a snake charmer and circus performer using a twenty-five foot python as a young adult. Presumably, she joined the Circus of Crime in its early days but isn't actually seen as a professional criminal until the formation of the Masters of Menace. It is, in fact, the Princess who convinces the others to get rid of the Ringmaster, appoint the Clown as the leader, rename the group (she comes up with the name), and go out on a crime spree of their own. The Masters of Menace steal paintings from a Madison Avenue Art Gallery where they run afoul of Spider-Man. However, the web-slinger is unwilling to hit a woman and turns out to be putty in Zelda's hands. She tries to remove his mask but he stops her in time. She maneuvers the wall-crawler into a fight with her pet after jamming his web shooters with an electric prod, but is defeated when Spider-Man tricks the python into a knot and maneuvers her into the arms of the law.

When they get out of prison, the Masters of Menace agree to rejoin the Ringmaster and his Circus of Crime. They try to hypnotize Avengers' members Hawkeye, Quicksilver, and the Scarlet Witch into joining them but fail. Princess Python fights hand-to-hand with the Scarlet Witch after trying to cover her eyes, but loses when the Witch uses her hex power to soak her down with water, preventing her whistling for her pet. The Circus of Crime does escape capture, however, though it is later mentioned the D.A. "wormed the truth out of Princess Python".

The Circus next schemes to steal a huge golden bull but they need a new strong man to replace theirs since "he strained himself trying to lift the elephant". They find the Mighty Thor who has been stripped of his godly power but is still superhumanly strong. Thor is hypnotized into stealing the massive golden bull but Princess Python is trapped under the idol in the melee that follows. Thor rescues her. The grateful and somewhat smitten Princess tells the police that Thor was duped into helping them before she uses her snake to escape and rejoin the Circus.

In their next caper, the Circus disguises themselves as caterers in order to sneak into Avengers Mansion so they can disrupt the wedding of Yellowjacket and the Wasp. Zelda's giant python jumps out of the wedding cake and puts the squeeze on the Wasp. But Yellowjacket turns out to be Hank Pym (which no one knew at the time) and he disrupts the plan by turning into Giant-Man, yanking the python off of the Wasp and tying it around the Ringmaster instead. Princess Python tries to sneak away, only to be decked by a punch from the Wasp.

The Circus then sets up a scheme that involves enlisting a mind-controlled Ulik the Troll as an accomplice. Thor thwarts the plan and ties Zelda up with her own python in the process.

At this point, the Princess struck out on her own. She goes out to Stark Industries and manages to get an opportunity to get her python around Tony Stark. She tells the world that she wants "one million dollars and a jet plane to South America" or Stark dies. Stark, secretly Iron Man, frees himself by using his chest-plate to shock the snake. This isn't good enough. According to Zelda, her "precious" has been specially bred to be able to crush Iron Man's armor. The python nearly does so until Iron Man kills it by tossing it in a vat of acid. Zelda is so distraught over the death of her pet that she jumps in after it; only to be saved by Iron Man before she hits the acid. Iron Man, clearly not a pet lover, suggests the Princess be "taken care of by good doctors" because of her excessive hatred of him over the death of her snake.

Apparently, the Princess gets away from those doctors to whom Iron Man consigned her. The Princess acquires a new trained python and gets recruited by Viper to start a new Serpent Squad. Zelda breaks the Cobra and the Eel out of jail and they all battle Captain America in his Nomad identity. Eventually they are joined by Warlord Krang who is in possession of the Serpent Crown and the whole thing ends up involving the Sub-Mariner and Roxxon Oil. The Princess is defeated and led off to jail. She is back with the Circus of Crime soon after, but she and the Circus are defeated by Daredevil.

But the Circus never makes it to jail. They are freed from a prison wagon on its way to the penitentiary by Live Wire who then joins the group.

But she ends up back with the Circus when the group captures Luke Cage. Zelda finds herself attracted to Luke which doesn't please Luke's girlfriend Claire Temple. With the help of Black Goliath, Luke Cage defeats the Circus. Zelda is stopped when Luke's pal D.W. Griffith hypnotizes her with the Ringmaster's hat.

With the Circus of Crime, Princess Python captured the sea-nymph Meriam, and fought the Hulk. The Circus reaches its lowest point when it tries to enlist Howard the Duck as an unwilling accomplice, but he defeats them with help from Iris Raritan. Zelda gets bitten on the nose by Howard and runs away sobbing.

There is an adventure involving the Thing, Iceman, and the former Black Goliath now calling himself Giant-Man, and another involving the mind-controlled Hulk and Dragon Man. Then Death Adder recruits Zelda to join the Serpent Society and she attends an organizational meeting. The Society is led by Sidewinder and its other members are Constrictor, Black Mamba, Cottonmouth, Diamondback, Bushmaster, the Cobra, the Asp, the Rattler, and Anaconda. The Society is a longtime thorn in Captain America's side but the Princess decides to break away from the group when they are dispatched to kill MODOK and runs out. She is captured and brought back, where she is questioned and tortured by Sidewinder. She is sent to be ransomed back to the Circus of Crime, but Death Adder, who is delivering her, is killed by the Scourge of the Underworld before the transaction is complete.

Somehow, she finds her way back to the Circus where she is captured and defeated by the She-Hulk. Princess Python then turns up as the master of ceremonies at the "power pageant" of Superia's Femizons, introducing all the members of the group to each other. She battles Captain America and Paladin when they board Superia's cruise ship. Later, she gets refused admittance to the Bar With No Name by the bouncer (Angar the Screamer) because she won't check her python at the door.

Again with the Circus, she is thwarted by the Ben Reilly Spider-Man, Howard the Duck, and Gambit; Generation X; and the Peter Parker Spider-Man, Devil Dinosaur and Moon-Boy.

Around this time, Zelda hooks up with Johnny Blaze, the former Ghost Rider, who operates the Quentin Carnival. Python develops friendships among the crew and deep romantic feelings for Johnny. When there was trouble in a nearby trailer, she and Kody, a bear-man, rush over and succumb to knock-out gas by the trailer's owner, the assassin known as Arcade. While Johnny defeats Arcade, Kody drags her to safety.

Zelda and the other Masters of Menace (Clown, Cannonball and Gambonnos) resorted to armed robbery in between their stints of running the Circus (without the Ringmaster who has gone straight). The Hulk busted up these plans but the Princess was not captured in the process. She remains free and at large.

Following the Civil War storyline, Zelda made the startling revelation that she had been married to Stilt-Man during the latter's funeral held by supervillains and former supervillains. It was for her that a robot Doctor Doom was made to attend so as to give her the belief that Stilt-Man had been respected by some of the "major league" supervillains, and she also shared a sympathy dance with the Gibbon. By the end of the issue, the Bar that the wake had been held in was blown up by the Punisher. It was later mentioned that "they all had to get their stomachs pumped and be treated for third-degree burns."

Later, it was revealed that she was blinded in the explosion, but she has since married the Gibbon in order to be included on his insurance. Her original python Pythagoras had also gotten sick and died, however, Gibbon bought her a new python at the end of the story.

At the beginning of the Marvel Apes storyline, the Gibbon admits that even if Zelda truly loved him in the past, currently she's fed up with the loser streak of her new husband, and so they parted.

At the end of Dark Reign: Young Avengers #2, Executioner of the New Young Avengers call his mother on the phone to talk about Kate Bishop. His mother turns out to be Princess Python. Daniel seems unaware of Princess Python's costumed adventures, as their dialogue implies Daniel knows Zelda DuBois as a simple, but shady and rich businesswoman. Princess Python pressures Daniel into contacting Kate Bishop, even setting him a large fund for his New Young Avengers/Young Masters of Evil. In Dark Reign: Young Avengers #4, Daniel places a bomb in Zelda's car after learning of her super-villain past. Zelda is caught in the explosion and was apparently killed.

Princess Python turns up alive and appears as a member of Max Fury's new Masters of Evil line-up that serves the Shadow Council. During this time, she has a new python to replace the one that died.

As part of the All-New, All-Different Marvel event, Princess Python appears as a member of Viper's Serpent Society under its new name of Serpent Solutions.

During the "Opening Salvo" part of the Secret Empire storyline, Princess Python was with Serpent Solutions at the time when they are recruited by Baron Helmut Zemo to join the Army of Evil.

Princess Python was among several animal-themed super-villains captured and hunted by Kraven the Hunter.

Powers and abilities
Princess Python has no super human powers but she is a trained athlete and an extremely talented snake charmer and handler. She usually carries a hand held, electric cattle prod capable of discharging 1,000 volts.

Princess Python has a  trained pet rock python. She has had more than one such snake in her criminal career.

Other versions

Ruins
The Ruins version of Princess Python is a performer for the Quintano Carnival, America's last freak show, and it is implied that her act consists of indulging in bestiality with her python.

Ultimate Marvel
Princess Python appeared in the Ultimate Marvel universe as a member of the all-female Serpent Squad. Unlike her Earth-616 version, this Princess Python has super-strength and was able to knock a piece of the Thing's body off him.

Marvel Super Hero Adventures
In this comic book series aimed towards young children, Princess Python appears as a member of the Serpent Society. Alongside her teammates, Python battled Ms. Marvel, Spider-Man, and the Society's newest recruit, Garden Snake.

In other media
Princess Python appears in the Avengers Assemble episode "Crime and Circuses", voiced by Hynden Walch. She is depicted as a former member of the Circus of Crime. Hawkeye engages Princess Python during her raid on the docks and fights her until Falcon breaks up the fight. During the fight with the Circus of Crime, Princess Python showed up to assist Hawkeye and Falcon while telling them how to free the captive Avengers from Ringmaster's control. After the Circus of Crime are defeated and arrested, Hawkeye hooks Princess Python up with Nick Fury for a second chance at life.

References

External links
 Princess Python at Marvel.com
 Princess Python's Profile at the Women of Marvel Comics
 

Comics characters introduced in 1965
Characters created by Stan Lee
Characters created by Steve Ditko
Fictional characters from South Carolina
Marvel Comics female supervillains
Marvel Comics supervillains